Rens Blom (born 1 March 1977) is a Dutch retired athlete competing in pole vault.

Life
Blom was born in Munstergeleen. He achieved a vault of 5.75 as early as in 2000, but five years passed without much further progress. However, on 8 June 2004 in Zaragoza, he set the Dutch record with 5.81. In 2005, he consolidated his position by clearing 5.80 early in May.

At the 2005 World Championships in Athletics, he once again achieved 5.80 and won the gold medal. It was the first Dutch gold medal at a World Championship. In addition, Blom has won five national championships and four national indoor championships.

The year 2006 turned out to be a frustrating year for Blom, full of bad luck and injuries. Problems with his shoulder, knees and Achilles tendons resulting in an operation caused 2006 to become a "lost" year for the passionate Dutchman. Finally, in mid-October, he cautiously resumed his training programme, and achieved better results in several indoor events at the start of 2007.

Blom is a two-time Olympian. At the 2000 Summer Olympics in Sydney he did not survive the qualification round. Four years later during the 2004 Summer Olympics, he ended up on the 9th place.

At a press conference in Sittard on 26 September 2008, Blom announced his retirement from the sport, feeling that, after various injuries and operations, his body no longer allowed him to strain it to the utmost. During his career Rens Blom collected six Dutch indoor and seven Dutch outdoor titles altogether. He returned to the sport in the 2013 season.

Competition record

External links

Official homepage

1977 births
Living people
Dutch male pole vaulters
Olympic athletes of the Netherlands
Athletes (track and field) at the 2000 Summer Olympics
Athletes (track and field) at the 2004 Summer Olympics
People from Sittard-Geleen
World Athletics Championships medalists
World Athletics Championships athletes for the Netherlands
World Athletics Championships winners
20th-century Dutch people
21st-century Dutch people
Sportspeople from Limburg (Netherlands)